Woyzeck  is a 1979 German drama film written, produced and directed by Werner Herzog and starring Klaus Kinski and Eva Mattes. It is an adaptation of the unfinished play Woyzeck by German dramatist Georg Büchner.

Plot synopsis
Franz Woyzeck, a lowly soldier stationed in a mid-nineteenth century provincial German town, is the father of an illegitimate child by his mistress Marie. Woyzeck earns extra money for his family by performing menial jobs for the Captain and agreeing to take part in medical experiments conducted by the Doctor. As one of these experiments, the Doctor tells Woyzeck he must eat nothing but peas. Woyzeck's mental health is breaking down and he begins to experience a series of apocalyptic visions. Meanwhile, Marie grows tired of Woyzeck and turns her attentions to a handsome drum major who, in an ambiguous scene taking place in Marie's bedroom, sleeps with her.

After some time, and with his jealous suspicions growing, Woyzeck confronts the drum major, who beats him up and humiliates him. Finally and at the verge of mental breakdown, Woyzeck stabs Marie to death by a pond. Woyzeck disposes of the knife in the pond, and while trying to wash the blood off, he hallucinates that he is swimming in blood and apparently drowns himself and dies. While recovering the corpses, the townspeople relish the fact that "a real murder" has taken place, distracting everyone from their mind-numbingly boring lives.

Cast
 Klaus Kinski as Friedrich Johann Franz Woyzeck
 Eva Mattes as Marie
 Wolfgang Reichmann as Captain
 Willy Semmelrogge as Doctor
 Josef Bierbichler as Drum Major
 Paul Burian as Andres
 Volker Prechtel as Handwerksbursche
 Dieter Augustin as Marktschreier
 Irm Hermann as Margret
 Wolfgang Bächler as Jew

Production
Filming for Woyzeck in Telč, Czechoslovakia, began just five days after work on Herzog's Nosferatu the Vampyre had ended. Herzog used the same exhausted crew and star. The scenes were accomplished mostly in a single take, which allowed the filming to be completed in only 18 days; it was edited in just four. Herzog had planned to use Bruno S. in the title role, but he then changed his mind, considering Kinski more suitable for the part. To compensate Bruno for this disappointment, Herzog wrote the leading role in the film Stroszek especially for him.

At the 1979 Cannes Film Festival, Eva Mattes won the award for Best Supporting Actress for her part in this film. Herzog was nominated for the Golden Palm. In 1981, the film won the Silver Guild Film Award from the Guild of German Art House Cinemas.

Reception
Woyzeck has an 85% rating on Rotten Tomatoes with an average rating of 7.3/10 based on 13 reviews. In an episode of Sneak Previews both Roger Ebert and Gene Siskel recommended the film.

Soundtrack

 The music during the opening scene before the credits is Beethoven Piano Sonata Op. 81a, Second Movement ("Abwesenheit" or "Absence") performed on a celeste.
 The opening credits strings music is performed by the Fidelquartett Telč, which also performs live during the movie. The performance seems to have been created for the movie since no further reference is available.
 The last song of the closing credits is the second movement (largo) of Antonio Vivaldi's concerto for lute and two violins in D major (RV93), played with the guitar.

References

External links
 
 
 

1979 films
1979 drama films
German drama films
West German films
1970s German-language films
German films based on plays
Films directed by Werner Herzog
Films set in the 1830s
Works based on Woyzeck
1970s German films